Turkey bush is a common name for several plants and may refer to:

Acalypha eremorum, endemic to Queensland
Calytrix exstipulata, endemic to Western Australia
Eremophila deserti, endemic to Australia
Grewia retusifolia